The Thompson River is a tributary of the Franquelin River, flowing in the township of Franquelin, in the municipality of Franquelin, in the Manicouagan Regional County Municipality, in the administrative region of Côte-Nord, in the province of Quebec, in Canada.

Forestry is the main economic activity in this valley.

The surface of this Middle North Shore river is usually frozen from the beginning of November to the end of April, except the rapids areas; however, traffic on the ice is generally safe from late November to early April.

Geography 
The Thompson River originates from an unidentified lake located in the municipality of Franquelin.

  south across Lake Thompson, to its mouth. Note: A discharge (coming from the south-east) from four lakes discharges on the south-eastern shore of this lake;
  first towards the south while bending towards the south-west, until its mouth.

The Thompson River flows onto the east bank of the Franquelin River. This confluence is located at:

  north-east of the mouth of the Franquelin River;
  south-west of the village center of Godbout;
  north-east of downtown Baie-Comeau.

From the mouth of the Thompson river, the current descends on  the course of the Franquelin river to the north shore of the estuary of Saint Lawrence.

Toponymy 
The term "Thompson" is a family name of English origin. The toponyms "Lake Thompson" and "Thompson River" are linked.

The toponym "Rivière Thompson" was formalized on 1968-12-05 at the Place Names Bank of the Commission de toponymie du Québec.

See also 

 Gulf of St. Lawrence
 List of rivers of Quebec

References 

Rivers of Côte-Nord
Manicouagan Regional County Municipality